State Route 179 (SR 179) is a primary state highway in the U.S. state of Virginia. The state highway runs  from SR 1023 in Onancock east to U.S. Route 13 Business (US 13 Business) in Onley in central Accomack County.

Route description

SR 179 begins at Onancock Wharf in the town of Onancock, where the historic Hopkins and Brother Store is located. The road curves back to the east as SR 1023 (King Street) at the head of the peninsula between the North and Central branches of Onancock Creek on which the town is centered. SR 179 heads east through the town as two-lane undivided Market Street, which passes by the historic Cokesbury Church. The state highway meets the western end of SR 126 (Fairgrounds Road) at the eastern edge of town. Following this, the roadway passes north of Riverside Shore Memorial Hospital. SR 179 continues east to the town of Onley, on the edge of which the highway intersects US 13 (Lankford Highway). The state highway curves south as Main Street to its southern terminus at US 13 Business (Coastal Boulevard) in the center of Onley.

Major intersections

References

External links

Virginia Highways Project: VA 179

179
State Route 179